Austrostipa ramosissima,  the stout bamboo grass, grows in moist areas in eastern Australia. It is often found in well-drained habitats in eucalyptus woodlands or forests.

Flowering may occur at any time of the year.

Cultivation 
Austrostipa ramosissima is cultivated as an ornamental grass by plant nurseries, for use in gardens and drought tolerant landscaping.  It is planted in the ground and in pots.

References

External links

ramosissima
Bunchgrasses of Australasia
Flora of New South Wales
Flora of Queensland
Flora of Lord Howe Island
Garden plants of Australia